In combinatorial mathematics, the Prüfer sequence (also Prüfer code or Prüfer numbers) of a labeled tree is a unique sequence associated with the tree.  The sequence for a tree on n vertices has length n − 2, and can be generated by a simple iterative algorithm.  Prüfer sequences were first used by Heinz Prüfer to prove Cayley's formula in 1918.

Algorithm to convert a  tree into a Prüfer sequence
One can generate a labeled tree's Prüfer sequence by iteratively removing vertices from the tree until only two vertices remain.  Specifically, consider a labeled tree T with vertices {1, 2, ..., n}.  At step i, remove the leaf with the smallest label and set the ith element of the Prüfer sequence to be the label of this leaf's neighbour.

The Prüfer sequence of a labeled tree is unique and has length n − 2.

Both coding and decoding can be reduced to integer radix sorting and parallelized.

Example

Consider the above algorithm run on the tree shown to the right.  Initially, vertex 1 is the leaf with the smallest label, so it is removed first and 4 is put in the Prüfer sequence.  Vertices 2 and 3 are removed next, so 4 is added twice more.  Vertex 4 is now a leaf and has the smallest label, so it is removed and we append 5 to the sequence.  We are left with only two vertices, so we stop.  The tree's sequence is {4,4,4,5}.

Algorithm to convert a Prüfer sequence into a tree

Let {a[1], a[2], ..., a[n]} be a Prüfer sequence:

The tree will have n+2 nodes, numbered from 1 to n+2.
For each node set its degree to the number of times it appears in the sequence plus 1.
For instance, in pseudo-code:

  Convert-Prüfer-to-Tree(a)
  1 n ← length[a]
  2 T ← a graph with n + 2 isolated nodes, numbered 1 to n + 2
  3 degree ← an array of integers
  4 for each node i in T do
  5     degree[i] ← 1
  6 for each value i in a do
  7     degree[i] ← degree[i] + 1

Next, for each number in the sequence a[i], find the first (lowest-numbered) node, j, with degree equal to 1, add the edge (j, a[i]) to the tree, and decrement the degrees of j and a[i]. In pseudo-code:

  8 for each value i in a do
  9     for each node j in T do
 10         if degree[j] = 1 then
 11             Insert edge[i, j] into T
 12             degree[i] ← degree[i] - 1
 13             degree[j] ← degree[j] - 1
 14             break

At the end of this loop two nodes with degree 1 will remain (call them u, v). Lastly, add the edge (u,v) to the tree.

 15 u ← v ← 0
 16 for each node i in T
 17     if degree[i] = 1 then
 18         if u = 0 then
 19             u ← i
 20         else
 21             v ← i
 22             break
 23 Insert edge[u, v] into T
 24 degree[u] ← degree[u] - 1
 25 degree[v] ← degree[v] - 1
 26 return T

Cayley's formula

The Prüfer sequence of a labeled tree on n vertices is a unique sequence of length n − 2 on the labels 1 to n. For a given sequence S of length n–2 on the labels 1 to n, there is a unique labeled tree whose Prüfer sequence is S.

The immediate consequence is that Prüfer sequences provide a bijection between the set of labeled trees on n vertices and the set of sequences of length n − 2 on the labels 1 to n.  The latter set has size nn−2, so the existence of this bijection proves Cayley's formula, i.e. that there are 
nn−2 labeled trees on n vertices.

Other applications
 Cayley's formula can be strengthened to prove the following claim: 
The number of spanning trees in a complete graph  with a degree  specified for each vertex  is equal to the multinomial coefficient

The proof follows by observing that in the Prüfer sequence number  appears exactly  times.

 Cayley's formula can be generalized:  a labeled tree is in fact a spanning tree of the labeled complete graph. By placing restrictions on the enumerated Prüfer sequences, similar methods can give the number of spanning trees of a complete bipartite graph.
 Generating uniformly distributed random Prüfer sequences and converting them into the corresponding trees is a straightforward method of generating uniformly distributed random labelled trees.

References

External links
 Prüfer code – from MathWorld

Enumerative combinatorics
Trees (graph theory)